This is a list of rugby union footballers who have played for the Crusaders in Super Rugby. The list includes any player that has played in a regular season match, semi-final or final for the Crusaders.

Players are listed alphabetically.

List is updated up as of 11 April 2021. As of April 2021 248 individuals have played for the Crusaders. The latest player to debut for the Crusaders is Fletcher Newell, Crusader #248.

External links 

 Past players no longer playing for the Crusaders: 
 2018 Current Crusaders: 

 
Cav
Crusaders
Super Rugby players